Springfield is a locality in the Snowy Monaro Regional Council. It is about 35 km west of Nimmitabel and bounded by Bobundara Creek on its northern side and the Maclaughlin River forms part of the southern boundary. Maffra lies further west.

References

Towns in New South Wales
Snowy Monaro Regional Council